Streetmate is a reality dating game show that first aired on Channel 4 from 30 October 1998 to 9 March 2001, hosted by Davina McCall, and then aired on ITV2 from 27 September to 29 November 2007, this time hosted by Holly Willoughby. The series returned to Channel 4 in 2017, instead hosted by Scarlett Moffatt.

History
A spin-off version called Beachmate aired for 5 episodes in 2001 hosted by Tania Strecker.

Two special editions of the show have aired for charity: the first was a celebrity episode with Emma Bunton and Brian Dowling for Comic Relief on 14 March 2003; the second was for Stand Up to Cancer UK on 21 October 2016. This mini episode featured First Dates star Fred Sirieix.

Format
The host picks an eligible male or female from the streets, and then with their help, they approach equally eligible members of the opposite/same sex for a date. The couple will then go on a date and then report if it was a success or a failure.

However, for the 2017 series, the first person looking for a partner was already chosen.

Transmissions

Original

Beachmate

Specials

References

External links

1998 British television series debuts
2017 British television series endings
1990s British reality television series
2000s British reality television series
2010s British reality television series
British dating and relationship reality television series
Channel 4 reality television shows
English-language television shows
ITV reality television shows
Television series by Endemol
Television series by Tiger Aspect Productions
British television series revived after cancellation
1990s British game shows
2000s British game shows
2010s British game shows